The Bad & the Better is the fourth studio album by American electropop singer-songwriter The Ready Set. The album title was announced on March 18, 2014 along with the track listing. It was released on May 27, 2014 by Razor & Tie Records. The album was released as a 4 track-EP featuring the singles "Higher", "Freaking Me Out" and "Give Me Your Hand (Best Song Ever)" plus the song "Carry Me Home" digitally outside the United States.

Background
On June 6, 2013, Witzigreuter announced that he finished writing his fourth studio album on Twitter.

On March 18, 2014, the Ready Set signed to Razor & Tie Records announcing the release of his upcoming album, The Bad & the Better. Witzigreuter spoke about being signed to Razor & Tie stating, "I'm so excited to be signed to Razor & Tie. I feel like it's a great opportunity to get more of my music out there in really creative ways, and I've already seen a ton of passion. I think it's going to be a great partnership." Co-owner of Razor & Tie Cliff Chenfeld added,  "We are very excited that Jordan and The Ready Set have chosen to work with Razor & Tie.  Jordan is an amazing talent and we will do everything we can do to get his music to the largest possible audience."

Singles
The Ready Set released "Give Me Your Hand (Best Song Ever)" as the first single from The Bad & the Better. The song peaked at number 30 on the US Mainstream Top 40 and at number 33 in New Zealand. The second official single, "Higher", was released on April 8, 2014. The song was serviced to contemporary hit radio in the United States on May 6, 2014. That same day, the third single, "Freakin' Me Out" was released. The music video was released on October 15, 2014 via VEVO. A live music video for the track "Fangz" directed by Sergio Padilla was released on December 10, 2014.

Critical reception

Tim Sendra of AllMusic rated the album three-and-a-half stars, remarking how the release is "all AM pop giddiness, spunky energy, and soft-pedaled, cuddly heartbreak", and how "It's machine-driven, it's juvenile, and it's not going to change the world, but it's a bunch of fun and that's plenty." At Alternative Press, Evan Lucy rated the album two and a half stars, stating that the release is "ultimately disappointing."

Track listing

Personnel
Credits for The Bad & the Better adapted from AllMusic.

 Jordan Witzigreuter - cover design, producer
 David Beame - legal advisor
 Dylan Chenfeld - A&R
 David Conway - management
 Serban Ghenea - mixing
 Andrew Goldstein - producer
 Dirk Hemsath - management
 Bob Hoch - marketing

 Jon Kaplan - mixing 
 Ian Kirkpatrick - producer
 Jared Kocka - photography
 Joe LaPorta - mastering
 Joseph McCarthy - layout
 Jake Miller - featured artist
 Eric Palmqwist - mixing, producer
 Danny Rukasin - management

Charts

References

2014 albums
The Ready Set albums
Razor & Tie albums
Albums produced by Ian Kirkpatrick (record producer)